La Perla (literally The Pearl) is a 1518-1520 oil on canvas painting by Raphael. At this stage clearly influenced by his encounter with Leonardo (1513-1516) the pyramidal arrangement of the characters, the light contrasts and the recreation of a landscape that is no longer idealized but realistic are proof of it.

The fnal composition differs from the preparatory drawing, even if it follows the countours of the drawing is simple to detect several details that have been corrected. X-Rays shows that there was a first version in the underlying layer that follows very much the original drawing (obvserved means of the reflectography).Therefore it is logical to point out that there were two phases in the execution of the canvas; a first one that followed the drawing and a later one that introduced substantial changes to the appearance of the work in order to produce a great tension instead of the initial serene calm of the characters. To achieve this, the children's heads were filled with curls, while the Virgins head was sharpened, the folds are complicated and sinuous and the contrast between light and shadow intensified.

It may be identifiable with the painting mentioned in Vasari's Lives of the Artists as made for Ludovico Canossa (Bayeux's bishop). Later Galeazzo Canossa ceded to Vincenzo I Gonzaga.The painting definitely passed to Charles I of Great Britain in 1627 and after his execution iing   it passed into the hands of one of its creditors, Edward Bass, from whom Alonso de Cárdenas bought it on behalf of Don Luis de Haro. He gives it to Philip IV of Spain, who gave it its current name, since he saw it as "the pearl" of his collection (his favourite). It was taken to Paris in 1813 by Joseph Bonaparte and it remained there until 1815. The Madonna and Child with John the Baptist, Saint Anne and in the background St Joseph. It has been in collection of the Museo del Prado since 1857.

Part of another version has recently been found in the galleria Estense in Modena, known as the Perla di Modena.

See also
List of paintings by Raphael

References

Bibliography
  Pierluigi De Vecchi, Raffaello, Rizzoli, Milano 1975.

External links

Paintings of the Museo del Prado by Italian artists
Paintings by Giulio Romano
Paintings of the Madonna and Child by Raphael
1520 paintings
Gonzaga art collection
Paintings of the Madonna and Child
Paintings of Saint Joseph
Paintings depicting John the Baptist
Paintings of Elizabeth (biblical figure)